Sherlock Holmes is the overall title given to the BBC Radio 4 radio dramatisations of the complete Sherlock Holmes stories, with Bert Coules as head writer, and featuring Clive Merrison as Holmes and Michael Williams as Dr Watson. Together, the two actors completed radio adaptations of every story in the canon of Sherlock Holmes between 1989 and 1998.

The episodes were not originally broadcast under an overall title, and aired in series with the same titles as the novels or short story collections that the episodes were adapted from. For instance, the first two episodes were based on the novel A Study in Scarlet and aired under that title on BBC Radio 4's Classic Serial programme.

Episodes of the series are available on CD as well as downloads, and are occasionally rebroadcast on BBC Radio 4 Extra.

Production

The BBC decided to produce radio adaptations of all sixty Sherlock Holmes stories by Arthur Conan Doyle due to the success of a 1988 radio adaptation of The Hound of the Baskervilles. David Johnston produced and directed the production, which was adapted by Bert Coules, and starred Roger Rees as Sherlock Holmes and Crawford Logan as Dr. Watson.

For the complete series of adaptations, Clive Merrison was cast as Holmes and Michael Williams as Watson. Both of the first two dramatisations of the series, adaptations of A Study in Scarlet and The Sign of the Four, were produced by David Johnston and directed by Ian Cotterell. Enyd Williams produced and directed the adaptation of The Valley of Fear and the 1998 version of The Hound of the Baskervilles. Each of the fifty-six short story adaptations were produced and directed by either Enyd Williams or Patrick Rayner. The head writer for the series was Bert Coules. The other writers were David Ashton, Michael Bakewell, Roger Danes, Robert Forrest, Denys Hawthorne, Gerry Jones, Peter Ling, Vincent McInerney and Peter Mackie.

The broadcast of the last dramatisation, the 1998 version of The Hound of the Baskervilles, marked the first time that the same two actors had played Holmes and Watson in dramatisations of all sixty stories on radio or any other medium. This was not accomplished again until 2016 when the American radio series The Classic Adventures of Sherlock Holmes was completed. It had almost been accomplished in the 1930s radio series The Adventures of Sherlock Holmes in which all but one of the stories (The Valley of Fear) were adapted.

Bert Coules wrote a book about the radio dramatisations of the Sherlock Holmes canon. The book, titled 221 BBC, also includes information about the follow-up BBC radio series The Further Adventures of Sherlock Holmes.

Episodes

A Study In Scarlet
Two one-hour episodes adapted from A Study In Scarlet were recorded October 1989, at BBC studios, Maida Vale, London and first broadcast on 5 and 12 November 1989.

The Sign of the Four
The following episodes were adapted from the novel The Sign of the Four.

The Adventures of Sherlock Holmes
The following episodes were adapted from the short story collection The Adventures of Sherlock Holmes.

The Memoirs of Sherlock Holmes
The following episodes were adapted from The Memoirs of Sherlock Holmes.

The Return of Sherlock Holmes
The following episodes were adapted from The Return of Sherlock Holmes.

His Last Bow
The following episodes were adapted from His Last Bow.

The Case-book of Sherlock Holmes
The following episodes were adapted from The Case-Book of Sherlock Holmes.

The Valley of Fear
The following episodes were adapted from the novel The Valley of Fear.

The Hound of the Baskervilles
The following episodes were adapted from the novel The Hound of the Baskervilles.

The Further Adventures of Sherlock Holmes

The Further Adventures of Sherlock Holmes, a series consisting of original stories written exclusively by Bert Coules was then commissioned, but following Williams' death from cancer in 2001, he was replaced by Andrew Sachs.

The episodes were based on throwaway references in Doyle's short stories and novels. They were broadcast on BBC Radio 4 across four series in 2002, 2004, 2008–2009 and 2010.

Episodes

See also 
Hercule Poirot (radio series)
Miss Marple (radio series)
Lord Peter Wimsey (radio series)

References

BBC Radio 4 programmes
Detective radio shows
Works based on Sherlock Holmes